"Up & Down (In & Out)" is a song by Canadian singer Deborah Cox. It was written by Cox, Alex Richbourg, James Wright, Jimmy Jam, and Terry Lewis for her third studio album The Morning After (2002), with production helmed by Jam, Lewis, Wright and Godson. The song, along with a slightly remixed version featuring additional vocals from rapper Jadakiss, was released as the album's lead single in 2002, reaching number 23 on the Billboard Adult R&B Songs chart.

Critical reception
Vibe editor Sony Askew felt that "Up & Down (In & Out)" showcased "Deborah's warm and mellow yet classically trained voice." Billboard found that the song recalled Toni Braxton and Whitney Houston.

Music video
A music video for the Allstar Remix of "Up & Down (In & Out)" was directed by Kevin Bray. Rapper Jadakiss appears alongside Cox in the clip.

Track listings
All tracks produced by Jimmy Jam and Terry Lewis, with additional production by James "Big Jim" Wright and Alex Richbourg.

Credits and personnel
Credits lifted from the liner notes of The Morning After.

Deborah Cox – background vocalist, lead vocalist, writer
Steve Hodge – mixing engineer
Jimmy Jam – producer, writer
Terry Lewis – producer, writer

Herb Powers, Jr. – mastering engineer
Alex "Godson" Richbourg – associate producer, writer
Prof. T – background vocalist
James "Big Jim" Wright – associate producer, writer

Charts

References

2002 songs
2002 singles
Deborah Cox songs
Songs written by Jimmy Jam and Terry Lewis
Song recordings produced by Jimmy Jam and Terry Lewis
Songs written by Alexander Richbourg
Songs written by Deborah Cox